Freenote is a Japanese Rock band that consisted of three (formerly four, with the member Shusako sato leaving) members: Chikako Hata (Vocals, Piano/Keyboard, Guitar), Masaya Sakamoto (Guitar), and Shingo Ōta(Drums).  Formed in Kansai University in 2002, the group's first mini album was published on an indy label on December 3, 2003.

The band first gained nationwide exposure when their first single, Kirai Tune (キライチューン), was used as the ending theme for the popular Japanese anime series Bobobo-bo Bo-bobo.  Subsequently, they received worldwide exposure (albeit to a much lesser extent) when the series became syndicated for worldwide distribution.

Since then, the group has released a number of singles and two full-length albums, but currently remain critically acclaimed, yet without commercial success on the Japanese pop charts.

In August 25th, 2013, freenote disbanded with a live performance at  Shimokitazawa CLUB Que. The lead vocalist Chikako Hata became a vocal coach, and you can find her website here.

the main bassist, shusako left the group on September 30, 2015 and joined KELUN, coincidentally the band who did one of Bleach (an anime's) openings

Discography

Singles
Debut Single - キライチューン (Kirai Tune) - May 26, 2004
キライチューン 
ボクラリズム 
スロウ

2nd Single - Re:チャンネル (Re: Channel) - November 10, 2004
Re:チャンネル 
遥かへのスピードランナー
エアロプレイン

3rd Single - ウォークメン (Walkmen) - March 2, 2005
ウォークメン
Our Song
TELEPATHY

4th Single - さよならの歌 (Sayonara no Uta) - August 24, 2005
さよならの歌
Monday Morning
Sing A Song

5th Single - ピアノを弾いて (Piano wo Hiite) - November 9, 2005
ピアノを弾いて
SMDY
ピアノを弾いて (Acoustic version)

Mini albums
 Mini Album － 風花 - October 7, 2002
風花
PASSING POINT
BRAND NEW DETERMINATION
HEATSTROKE
鼓動

1st Mini Album - 終電マスター (Shūden Master) - December 3, 2003
終電マスター
ひまわり
image
YOU
ハッピーバースデイ

Albums
Introducing the Popline According to FREENOTE - April 20, 2005
Intro
ウォークメン
キライチューン
Dance Love
遥かへのスピードランナー
トビラ
終電マスター
Interlude
My Little War
Re:チャンネル
ボクラリズム
Happy Birthday
さよならの歌
Outro

オトノハトライアングル (Otonoha Triangle) - July 25, 2007
DROP
HOME
サンキューフォーザミュージック
ターミナル
ウサギノメ
歩いていこう
かなた
Life Is Beautiful
ゆびきり
アオイクマ
雨模様
サクラノート

ルート 3 (Route 3) - September 24, 2008
サマータイムブルー
ハローグッバイ 
ラストワルツ
バッテリー
ディーン
あいのかたち
東京ラブストーリー 
手紙
ペチカ
ルーティンワーク
Drawing
そらいろ

External links
FREENOTE Official Website

Japanese rock music groups
Toy's Factory artists
Kansai University alumni